Balanbaal is a town in the southern Togdheer region of Somaliland. It is located in the Burao District, northwest by road from Buuhoodle and south of Burco.

See also
Administrative divisions of Somaliland
Regions of Somaliland
Districts of Somaliland

Notes

References
Balanbaal, Somalia

Populated places in Togdheer